Stratmanns Theater Europahaus  is a theatre in Essen, North Rhine-Westphalia, Germany.

Theatres in North Rhine-Westphalia
Amerika Häuser

de:Amerikahaus Ruhr#Stratmanns Theater Europahaus